Quetta attack may refer to:

2003 Quetta mosque bombing
September 2010 Quetta bombing
2011 Hazara Town shooting
August 2011 Quetta bombing
January 2013 Pakistan bombings
February 2013 Quetta bombing
June 2013 Quetta attacks
August 2013 Quetta bombing
9 August 2013 Quetta shooting
2014 Quetta Airbase attack
January 2016 Quetta suicide bombing
August 2016 Quetta attacks
2016 Quetta police training college attack
June 2017 Pakistan attacks
August 2017 Quetta suicide bombing
2017 Quetta church attack
2018 Quetta suicide bombing
2019 Quetta bombing
January 2020 Quetta bombing
February 2020 Quetta bombing
August 2021 Quetta bombing
Quetta Serena Hotel bombing, in April, 2021
August 2021 Quetta bombing
September 2021 Quetta bombing
November 2022 Quetta bombing